Novoselenginsk is a rural locality (a settlement) in Selenginsky District of the Republic of Buryatia, Russia, located on the Selenge River south of Lake Baikal. Formerly called simply Selenginsk, it was one of the most important towns in Siberia before 1800.

History

The first fortified settlement of the Russians on the Selenge River, Selenginsky ostrog was located north of the confluence of the Chikoy and Selenge Rivers on the Selenge's right bank. The Selenge River soon became part of the main Russo-Chinese trade route, which, by boat, led through Siberia to Lake Baikal, up the Selenge, and then by caravan southeast to Peking. Consequently, the ostrog soon grew and became a major administrative center of the Transbaikal region.

In 1677-1680, a secondary fort was built downriver at what later became Ulan-Ude.

In 1688, the ostrog was besieged by the Khalkha Mongols for two months, but they had to withdraw when their main territory was attacked by the Oirats. The Khalkas, who at this time were vassals of the Manchus, attacked because the Russians had taken control of their kinsmen and vassals, the Buryats and because the Russians were giving asylum to fugitives. The defence was led by Demian Mnohohrishny, an exiled Cossack who had previously played an important part in Ukrainian history.  He died and was buried here in 1703. Also present was Fyodor Golovin. The Treaty of Nerchinsk (1689) would have been negotiated here, but Golovin was forced to move east to Nerchinsk so that the Manchu ambassadors could avoid the fighting in Mongolia.)

In 1727-1730, Abram Petrovich Gannibal, Alexander Pushkin's African great-grandfather, was exiled here after Peter the Great's death. He was involved in shifting the fortress to a new location.

In 1729, it was a center for the negotiation of the Treaty of Kyakhta. This led to the foundation of Kyakhta on the Russo-Chinese border upstream which later became a more important town.

By 1745, it was the largest town east of Lake Baikal with 4,000 inhabitants. State caravans ran through here until 1755. Two large fires in 1783 left only fifteen houses and parts of the fort standing. Many merchants moved north to Ulan-Ude where a fair had been established in 1780.

From 1819 Selenginsk was home to Edward Stallybrass and his fellow missionaries of the London Missionary Society, who with the blessing of Alexander I of Russia sought to bring the Christian gospel to the Buryat people. The mission, which relocated to Khodon in 1828, was eventually suppressed in 1840 by the Holy Synod of the Russian Orthodox Church under Alexander I's successor, Nicholas I.

In Novoselenginsk exiled Decembrists: K. Thorson from September 1, 1839 on December 4, 1851; Nikolai Bestuzhev from January 21, 1837 on May 15, 1855; his brother Mikhail Bestuzhev from 1 September 1839 to June 1867. Michael was extensive description Selenginsk middle of the 19th century. They began to publish more in 1861. The Decembrists

The site was prone to flooding. Also, while the location between the river and the mountain spurs greatly improved the defensive capabilities of the fort, it also impeded the development of transportation links. In 1840, after a major fire, the settlement was moved across the river to the left bank. The old site came to be called Stary Selenginsk, or Staroselenginsk, and the new one became known as Novoselenginsk.

References

Rural localities in Selenginsky District
Populated places established in 1655
1655 establishments in Russia
Transbaikal Oblast